Modern Art is the Rippingtons' fifteenth album, released in 2009.

The album is the first Rippingtons album to not feature a hand percussion player. Guitarist/bandleader Russ Freeman cited a desire to explore the possibilities of a smaller ensemble.

Track listing
All songs composed by Russ Freeman, except where noted.

"Modern Art" - 4:17
"Paris Groove" - 3:39
"Black Book" - 3:59
"Pastels on Canvas" (Freeman, Yaredt Leon) - 4:54
"One Step Closer" - 4:41
"I Still Believe" (Freeman, Leon) - 4:38
"Body Art" - 4:40
"Age of Reason" - 4:28
"Sweet Lullaby" (Freeman, Leon) - 4:22
"Jet Set" - 4:14
"Love Story" - 4:03
"Twist of Fate" - 3:27 (iTunes only)

Personnel 
 Russ Freeman – keyboards, guitars, electric sitar, bass and rhythm programming 
 Bill Heller – keyboards 
 Rico Belled – bass
 Dave Karasony – drums
 Jeff Kashiwa – saxophones 
 Rick Braun – trumpet (11)

Production 
 Russ Freeman – producer, executive producer, arrangements, recording, mixing (2-5, 9)
 Andi Howard – executive producer, management
 Steve Sykes – mixing (1, 6, 7, 8, 10, 11)
 Alfredo Matheus – mixing (3, 4, 5)
 Bernie Grundman – mastering 
 Valerie Ince – product manager 
 Sonny Mediana – art direction, design, photography 
 MAD Design – art direction, design, photography 
 Bill Mayer – illustration

Studios
 Recorded and Mixed at Surfboard Studios (Boca Raton, Florida)
 Mastered at Bernie Grundman Mastering (Hollywood, California).

References

The Rippingtons albums
2009 albums